Márcio Antônio de Sousa Júnior (born 8 June 1995), commonly known as Marcinho, is a Brazilian footballer who plays for Saudi Arabian club Al-Riyadh as a winger.

Club career
Born in Inhumas, Goiás, Marcinho represented Vila Nova, Corinthians, Flamengo–SP and Ponte Preta. On 10 March 2016 he moved to Remo, and made his debut on 20 April by coming on as a late substitute in a 2–1 derby away loss against Paysandu for the Copa Verde championship.

A regular starter during the year's Série C, Marcinho signed for São Bernardo on 23 November 2016. He scored his first senior goal on 4 March of the following year, netting his team's second in a 3–1 Campeonato Paulista home win against Audax.

On 10 April 2017, Marcinho was loaned to Série A club São Paulo until the end of the year, with a buyout clause.

On 22 January 2023, Marchinho joined Al-Riyadh.

Career statistics

References

External links

1995 births
Living people
Sportspeople from Goiás
Brazilian footballers
Association football forwards
Campeonato Brasileiro Série A players
Campeonato Brasileiro Série B players
Campeonato Brasileiro Série C players
Saudi First Division League players
Clube do Remo players
São Bernardo Futebol Clube players
São Paulo FC players
Club Athletico Paranaense players
Goiás Esporte Clube players
Sport Club do Recife players
Esporte Clube Vitória players
Clube de Regatas Brasil players
Avaí FC players
Al-Riyadh SC players
Brazilian expatriate footballers
Expatriate footballers in Saudi Arabia
Brazilian expatriate sportspeople in Saudi Arabia